The Latin Brothers is a Colombian salsa group originally led by Julio Ernesto Estrada Rincón, known as 'Fruko'. It was created by Antonio Fuentes of the label Discos Fuentes as a response to the rival salsa groups of the day. Original lead singer Piper Pimienta along with Joe Arroyo and Julio Ernesto Estrada Rincón 'Fruko' carried the launch of the group's success in 1974. It was billed as a sister act to Fruko y sus Tesos on the Discos Fuentes label.

Among their most famous songs is "Las Caleñas son como las flores," which has become an anthem of sorts for the city of Cali, Colombia.  The song was featured on the soundtrack of the video game Scarface: The World Is Yours and has been cited by British-born, Colombia-based funk artist Quantic as an inspiration.

Fruko's son and protégé Julio Ernesto Estrada López Jr. would later become the Musical Director for the re-launch of the group after the untimely death of Piper Pimienta.

Hits 
A la loma de la cruz - (1974) Singer: Piper Pimienta
Dale al Bombo - (1975) Singer: John Jairo
Buscándote - (1975) Singer: Piper Pimienta
Patrona de los Reclusos - (1975) Singer: Joe Arroyo
Las Caleñas son como las flores - (1975) Canta: Piper Pimienta
Duelo de picoteros - (1975) Singer: Piper Pimienta
Bailame como quieras - (1977) Singer: Joe Arroyo
La guarapera - (1977) Singer: Joe Arroyo
Sobre las olas - (1986) Singer: Joseito Martínez
Fuma el barco - (1986) Singer: Joseito Martínez
Dime que paso - (1986) Singer: Morist Jimenez
A pesar - (1987) Singer: Morist Jimenez
Las calaveras -(1988) Singer: Brigido "Macondo" Chaverra
Salsa de la soledad- (1990)

Discography 

El picotero (1974)
 A la loma de la Cruz
 A la patrona de Cuba
 El picotero
 La loma
 La otra.
 La perla.
 Que no pare la rumba.
 San Juan de Puerto rico.
 Son dolores de cabeza.
 Y tu que

Dale al bombo (1975)
 dale al bombo
 velorio y baile
 siempre contigo
 la pandilla de la salsa
 los obreros
 buscandote
 duelo de picoteros
 cumbia a jose barros
 sombra del pasado

Te Encontre (1976)
 Te Encontre
 Dudando
 Dos Caminos
 Antioqueñita
 Canto Por No Llorar
 Ya No Hay Amor
 Patrona De Los Reclusos
 Quiero Ser Tu Vida
 Te fuiste A Cali
 Calle 13

Bailame como Quieras (1977)
 Bailame Como Quieras 		
 Mis Zapatos Blancos 		
 Linda Barranquilla 		
 Pa' Los Criticones 		
 Cuando Volera 		
 La Guarapera 		
 Sueno Que No Olvidaras 		
 Cumbiando 		
 Bella Cumbia 		
 Candelaria

Suavecito, Apretaito (1978)
 El son del caballo
 Suavecito apretaito
 Deja ese orgullo
 Para ti mi cantar
 La India Catalina
 El palito de limon
 Guantaranure
 Al son caliente
 La mondonguera
 Juan Retazo

En su Salsa (1979)
 Las Cabañuelas
 Buenos Días Tristeza
 No Es Negra, Es Morena
 Mi Bayo Trochador
 A La Cima De La Popa
 Hacha, Calabaza Y Miel
 Al Despertar
 El Cochero
 El Negro Adán
 Viejita Bella

 The Latin Brothers 80 - (1980)
 El culebro - (1981)
 Para bailar con The Latin Brothers - (1986)
 Fuma el barco
 Las mujeres y el casao
 Baila Ines
 Dime que paso
 La novela.
 El serrucho
 Para bailar
 No salgo de noche
 Lo mismo que ayer
 Sobre las olas.

 The Latin Brothers en el Caribe - (1987)
 Tremendo cachetero
 A pesar
 Juanita y su camarita
 Curiche
 Que voy a hacer
 El hablador
 El color del amor
 Amor ausente
 Pegaso
 Compay José
 Que hare sin ti
 Que me coma el tigre

 Salsa y son caribe - (1988)
 Papi Papa
 La Guayaba
 Contigo
 Ya Se Me Acabo
 Mi Morenita
 Serás Tú
 Trato De Olvidar
 Solo Iré A Ti
 El Barrigón
 Amor Desechable

 La negra quiere - (1989)
 La Negra Quiere
 Encrucujada De Amor
 El Gargareo
 Me Da Me Da
 Sancocho E Pescao
 Que Te Importa A Ti
 Esa Es La Mia
 El Cantante Y El Locutor
 Hermanos
 Amanda

 Sucesos - (1990)
 Nuestra salsa - (1991)
 Se Engordo La Negra
 Llanto De Un Latino
 Solo Contigo
 Chontaduro Maduro
 Nadie Es Eterno
 Eso Es Lo Que Quieres
 Yo La Tuve
 Bien Llegao
 Paz En Navidad
 Al Picacho

 The Latin Brothers -(1994)
 Renaciendo - (1997)
 El Trovador
 La Tormenta
 Amor Cellejero
 Amor del Bueno
 Tus Labios Rojos
 La Hipocondriaca
 Por Otra Amor
 Delia la Cumbiambera
 Sin Barreras
 Pasion Tropical

 Lo más sabroso - (1999)

Colombian salsa musical groups